The SX SJM 62 or 57 or 75 is a tailed bridge guitar made by SX Guitars with features similar to the Fender Jaguar and Jazzmaster. It is also available as a "stop tail" guitar, comprising a Tune-o-matic bridge and a stopbar tailpiece.

The shape of the upper half of the body is similar to the Fender design, but the bottom half is something unique.  It resembles a standard Jazzmaster body with part of the bottom bout cut away and "smooshed" over to form the fin. the body shape seems radical on first appearance the top-fin shape resembles other guitars noted for their ergonomics such as the Ovation Breadwinner and is possible to play quite comfortably in the classical style with the left leg raised. The guitar does not fit in a standard Strat case because of its unusual shape.

This and other SX guitars are popular for beginning or intermediate players and "modders" because of their low price and quality construction.  The guitar is also available in left-handed models. The numbers in the guitar's name refer to years and signify certain details common to guitars of that era. The SJM-62 has a rosewood fingerboard and comes in "custom colors" similar to Fender's options of the time. The SJM-57 has a maple board; all Fenders prior to 1959's Jazzmaster had maple boards. The SJM-75 has a natural finish, as was popular in the mid-1970s.

The body is made of alder (ash on natural-finished models) and the neck is maple. Contrary to appearance, and unlike the Jazzmaster upon which it is based, the SX SJM cannot be fitted with a Fender Stratocaster neck as the Strat's fingerboard hangs over the body at the 22nd fret, where the SJM's neck continues for the full length, resulting in a too-short scale and poor intonation when the SJM is fitted with the Stratocaster neck.

In the same way it is common for people to customize their Jazzmasters, it is popular for the SJM owner to replace the bridge on models fitted with a tremolo, with a Fender Mustang bridge and change out the tuners and possibly the volume and tone knobs because of their low quality plastic. A buzzstop can be installed to stop unwanted buzz and keep some tension on the strings, though some users find this dramatically alters the tonal properties of the guitar and interferes with tremolo use. If not fitted with a buzzstop, third bridge techniques are possible. It is also possible to insert a thin cardboard or wooden shim into the base of the neck pocket to increase the neck angle, resulting in a lower action.

In mid-2007 Rondo introduced two variations on the standard SJM, one with 3 P-90 pickups, a 5 way switch and 2 tone controls (the same control arrangement as on the Fender Stratocaster). The output jack on this model is on the side of the guitar. Also introduced is a 24" scale model, the same scale as the Fender Jaguar. They also changed the pickup covers and knobs on the sunburst and black models from cream to black in accordance with a popular user mod. A newer model (SJM-62H) is also available with two humbucker pickups instead of the soapbar P-90 and with knurled chrome metal control knobs instead of plastic. Another newer model is the SJM-62ST "stop-tail" version which features a bridge/tailpiece array much like that used on Gibson guitars, consisting of an intonable bridge and a stout, heavy fixed tailpiece anchored into the guitar body via threaded inserts and height-adjustable studs. This gives the guitar very good sustain characteristics.

Guitars